Going in Style is a 2017 American heist drama comedy film remake of the 1979 film of the same name. Directed by Zach Braff and written by Theodore Melfi, it stars Morgan Freeman, Michael Caine, Alan Arkin, Joey King, Matt Dillon, Christopher Lloyd, Ann-Margret, John Ortiz and Siobhan Fallon Hogan. It follows a trio of retirees (Freeman, Caine, and Arkin) who plan to rob a bank after their pensions are canceled.

The film premiered at the SVA Theatre on March 30, 2017, and was released in the United States on April 7, 2017. It received mixed reviews from critics and grossed $84 million worldwide against its $25 million budget.

Plot
Joe, Willie, and Albert are senior citizens and lifelong friends living in New York. During an unpleasant appointment at the bank, Joe is one of the victims to witness a robbery in progress carried out by three individuals wearing black masks. During the robbery, he notices the leader bearing a Mongol warrior tattoo on his neck as the only lead that could help the police identify the culprit. However, the leader sympathizes with Joe when he finds out about his current financial situation brought up by the bank. The robbers subsequently escape with over $1.6 million.

When the company they worked for is bought out, their pensions become a casualty of the restructuring. Joe is hit particularly hard and finds out that he, his daughter, Rachel, and granddaughter, Brooklyn, will be homeless in less than thirty days. Willie finds out he is gravely ill from kidney failure and needs a transplant and is even more frustrated because his financial situation forces him into a long-distance relationship with his daughter and granddaughter. Desperate, the three friends decide to rob the bank that is going to restructure their pension funds and take back what is rightfully theirs.

Inspired by his experience of the robbery, Joe originates the idea; at first Albert and Willie are appalled, but eventually agree when they later learn that their bank intends to steal their pensions. Trying to shoplift some items from a grocery store, where Al's love interest, Annie, works, results in a comic disaster, so the trio turn to Joe's former son-in-law, Peter Murphy, and a professional criminal and pet store owner named Jesús to teach them the ropes. They plan an alibi using their lodge's carnival as a cover.

Joe, Willie, and Albert disguise themselves as "The Rat Pack" (Frank Sinatra, Dean Martin, and Sammy Davis, Jr.) and use guns with blanks so that no one gets hurt. The robbery almost goes awry when Willie collapses briefly and Lucy, a child witness partially pulls off his mask to allow him to breathe better; she sees the wrist watch he wears with a picture of his granddaughter on it as he engages in a friendly conversation so as not to let her feel intimidated; however, the three manage to get away with over $2.3 million. They are soon arrested on suspicion by FBI Agent Hamer after the manager from the grocery store recognizes Al's walk from the video surveillance cameras, but they all stick to their alibis.

Hamer puts them along with other senior suspects into a police lineup, using Lucy, the child witness who partially took off Willie's mask. She refuses to identify Willie, leaving Hamer with no case. Willie suffers total kidney failure and is near death until Al agrees to donate a kidney. While part of the money is used to help the three friends with their financial situations, the rest is given to their families, friends, co-workers, and fellow members at the lodge. Joe finally gets his granddaughter a puppy he promised her if she got A's in every subject at school; courtesy of Jesús, who is later revealed to be the leader of the robbers from the robbery Joe witnessed and has laundered the money that they stole. The tattoo on his neck is also revealed to be a fake made of henna, intended to throw the FBI and the police off the scent. The movie ends at Al and Annie's wedding as the three friends celebrate their good fortune.

Cast
 Morgan Freeman as Willie Davis, Kanika's grandfather and Maya's father, one of the three protagonists.
 Michael Caine as Joe Harding, Brooklyn's grandfather, Rachel's father and Peter's father-in-law, one of the three protagonists.
 Alan Arkin as Albert Garner, one of the three protagonists, Annie's love interest and saxophone teacher.
 Matt Dillon as Special Agent Hamer, an FBI agent who investigates bank robberies.
 Ann-Margret as Annie Santori, Albert's love interest, Ezra's grandmother, and an employee at Value Town.
 Christopher Lloyd as Milton Kupchak, the guys' senile lodge buddy.
 Joey King as Brooklyn Harding, Joe's granddaughter and Peter and Rachel's daughter.
 Annabelle Chow as Lucy, Mandy's daughter and the child witness.
 John Ortiz as Jesús Garcia, a man of unspecified credentials who agrees to show the guys the ropes, a pet store owner in Queens, and the leader of robbers at the beginning of the film.
 Peter Serafinowicz as Peter Murphy, Joe's former son-in-law, Rachel's former husband, and Brooklyn's estranged father.
 Josh Pais as Chuck Lofton, the bank manager of Williamsburg Savings Bank who intends to take Joe's house in a month.
 Maria Dizzia as Rachel Harding, Joe's daughter, Peter's ex-wife and Brooklyn's mother.
 Kenan Thompson as Keith Schonfield, a grocery store manager of Value Town.
 Ashley Aufderheide as Kanika Davis, Willie's granddaughter and Maya's daughter.
 Gillian Glasco as Maya Davis, Willie's daughter and Kanika's mother.
 Siobhan Fallon Hogan as Mitzi, a waitress at Nat's Diner.
 Nancy Sun as Mandy, Lucy's mother.
 Jeremy Schinder as Ezra Bronkowski, Annie's grandson.
 Anthony Chisholm as Paul, the Knights Grandmaster.
 Jeremy Bobb as Donald Lewis

Production

Development
On October 12, 2012, it was announced that New Line Cinema and Warner Bros. were developing a remake of 1979 heist comedy film Going in Style, with Theodore Melfi set to write the script. Donald De Line was on board to produce the film with Tony Bill, producer of the original film, as executive producer. Melfi was approached by De Line and Andrew Haas about writing the screenplay for the remake, but Melfi insisted on changing the ending to something more upbeat. Melfi explained:

On January 9, 2013, Don Scardino was hired to direct the film. On September 19, 2013, Melfi, who wrote the script was in talks to direct the film. On November 19, 2014, it was revealed that Zach Braff was in talks with the studio to direct the film, but he was not officially offered yet. On November 19, 2014, it was announced that Morgan Freeman and Michael Caine were cast in the film to play the lead roles, while Dustin Hoffman was in talks to join them. On April 9, 2015, Alan Arkin joined the cast of the film to complete the lead cast of three. On August 3, 2015, Joey King joined the cast of the film to play Caine's character's granddaughter. On August 10, 2015, Matt Dillon was added to the cast to play an FBI agent named Hamer, pursuing the three elderly lifelong friends and robbers. The same day, Ann-Margret was cast in the film for an unspecified role.

Filming
Principal photography on the film began in Brooklyn, New York City, on August 3, 2015. Filming also took place in Astoria, Queens.

Soundtrack
The film features original music by composer Rob Simonsen, as well as songs by various artists and two of its stars:

 "Memories Are Made of This" – Dean Martin
 "St. Thomas" – Sonny Rollins
 "Feel Right" – Mark Ronson feat. Mystikal
 "Hard to Handle" – Otis Redding
 "Can I Kick It?" – A Tribe Called Quest
 "Hey, Look Me Over" – Jamie Cullum
 "Hallelujah I Love Her So" – Alan Arkin, Ann-Margret
 "Mean Old World" – Sam Cooke
 "What a Diff'rence a Day Makes" – Dinah Washington

Music not included in the soundtrack but heard in the film includes:
 "A Long Walk Out" – Leslie Mills
 "Yankee Doodle" – Lawrence Feldman
 "Happy Birthday to You" – Christopher Lloyd, cast
 "Automatic" – Brock Walsh, Mark Goldenberg
 "Higher Ground" – Stevie Wonder
 "Hey, Look Me Over" – Morgan Freeman, Michael Caine, and Alan Arkin
 "Sobre las Olas" – Juventino Rosas, carnival grounds instrumental

Release 
Going in Style was released on April 7, 2017, which Warner Bros moved from an original May 6, 2016 date.

Box office
Going in Style grossed $45 million in the United States and Canada and $39.6 million in other territories for a worldwide gross of $84.6 million, against a production budget of $25 million.

In North America, the film opened alongside Smurfs: The Lost Village and The Case for Christ, and was projected to gross around $8 million from 3,061 theaters in its opening weekend. It grossed $4.2 million on its first day and $11.9 million over the weekend, finishing above expectations and 4th at the box office. In its second weekend the film grossed $6.3 million (a drop of 47%), finishing 5th at the box office.

Critical response
On Rotten Tomatoes, the film has an approval rating of 47% based on 171 reviews, with an average rating of 5.4/10. The site's critical consensus reads, "Despite the considerable talent of its leads, Going in Style is light on laughs and plays it safe far too often." On Metacritic, the film has a weighted average score 50 out of 100, based on 31 critics, indicating "mixed or average reviews". Audiences polled by CinemaScore gave the film an average grade of "B+" on an A+ to F scale, while PostTrak reported filmgoers gave it an overall positive score of 83%.

References

External links 
 
 

2017 films
2010s crime comedy films
2010s buddy comedy films
2010s heist films
American buddy comedy films
American crime comedy films
Remakes of American films
American heist films
Films about bank robbery
Films about old age
Films directed by Zach Braff
Films produced by Donald De Line
Films scored by Rob Simonsen
Films set in New York City
Films set in 2016
Films shot in New York City
Films about gambling
New Line Cinema films
Village Roadshow Pictures films
Warner Bros. films
2017 comedy films
2010s English-language films
2010s American films